Soulful Road is the second and final studio album recorded by American male vocal quartet New York City, released in 1974 on the Chelsea label. The album's cover art parodies that of The Beatles' 1969 album Abbey Road.

Singles
The album features the song "Happiness Is", which peaked at  No. 20 on the Hot Soul Singles chart. Also featured are two other chart singles: "Love Is What You Make It" and "Got to Get You Back in My Life". Another single released, "Take My Hand", failed to chart.

Track listing

Personnel
Tim McQueen, John Brown, Edward Schell, Claude Johnson – vocals 
Linda Creed, Evette Benton, Barbara Ingram, Lucille Jones – background vocals

Production
Thom Bell – producer, arranger
Don Murray, Joe Tarsia – engineers
Michael Hutchinson, Jim Gallagher, Dirk Devlin – assistant engineers

Charts

Singles

References

External links
 

1974 albums
New York City (band) albums
Albums produced by Thom Bell
Albums arranged by Thom Bell
Chelsea Records albums
Albums recorded at Sigma Sound Studios